
This is a list of aircraft in alphabetical order beginning with 'S'.

Sy

SyberJet
 SyberJet SJ30

Sylvander 
(Victor Sylvander)
 Sylvander Biplane

Symphony
 Symphony Aircraft SA-160

Synairgie
(Montauban, France)
Synairgie Jet Ranger
Synairgie Sky Ranger

Synergy Paramotors
(California)
Synergy Paramotors Synergy

Syvrud 
(Sig Syvrud, Mandan, ND)
 Syvrud 1936 Biplane

References

Further reading

External links

 List Of Aircraft (S)

de:Liste von Flugzeugtypen/N–S
fr:Liste des aéronefs (N-S)
nl:Lijst van vliegtuigtypes (N-S)
pt:Anexo:Lista de aviões (N-S)
ru:Список самолётов (N-S)
sv:Lista över flygplan/N-S
vi:Danh sách máy bay (N-S)